George Burnaby Drayson (9 March 1913 – 16 September 1983) was a British Conservative Party politician.

Drayson was educated at Borlase School and was a company director and a member of the London Stock Exchange 1935–54. During World War II he served in the Western Desert with the Royal Artillery and was taken prisoner. He escaped in September 1943, and walked 500 miles, with a companion, through Axis-occupied Italy from north to south. He was a member of the Royal Agricultural Society and the Livestock Export Council of Great Britain.

Drayson was member of parliament for Skipton from 1945 to 1979, preceding John Watson.  Drayson saw off strong Liberal Party challenges to his position. He came closest to losing in the October 1974 general election to the ebullient, local Liberal candidate Claire Brooks just holding on with the narrow majority of 590 (1.4%).

References 
Times Guide to the House of Commons October 1974

External links 
 

1913 births
1983 deaths
Royal Artillery officers
British Army personnel of World War II
Conservative Party (UK) MPs for English constituencies
UK MPs 1945–1950
UK MPs 1950–1951
UK MPs 1951–1955
UK MPs 1955–1959
UK MPs 1959–1964
UK MPs 1964–1966
UK MPs 1966–1970
UK MPs 1970–1974
UK MPs 1974
UK MPs 1974–1979